Zoa Sherburne (30 September 1912 –  10 October 1995) was an American author, most known for her young adult fiction.

Early life
Sherburne was born in Seattle, Washington and began writing in elementary school. At 10, she started writing poetry.  Her local newspaper, the Ballard Tribune, published a column of her poetry called "The Gremlin's Say." She started writing short stories, poems, and plays.

Career
Sherburne went on to be a very prolific writer, publishing over 300 short stories in magazines. In the 1950s, upon her agent's suggestion, she began writing books as they noticed that short stories began to be less-published due to television's rising popularity.  She went on to publish thirteen novels, which together have been translated into over 27 languages. One of her books, Stranger in the House, about a family dealing with the return of their mother from a mental institution, became a movie: Memories Never Die (1982). Her novels often dealt with girls in difficult circumstances: coping with a mother's alcoholism (Jennifer), with the remarriage of a parent (Almost April and The Girl in the Mirror), with an unexpected pregnancy (Too Bad About the Haines Girl), with guilt over a hit-and-run (Leslie). In her time slip story Why Have the Birds Stopped Singing? the stigma of epilepsy is added to the usual cultural disorientation, and in her paranormal tale The Girl Who Knew Tomorrow, the young psychic girl finds fame a mixed blessing. For Jennifer, she received the Children's Book Award for 1959.

Awards
 1959, Children's Book Award

Published works
 Almost April (1956)
 The High White Wall (1957)
 Princess in Denim (1958)
 Jennifer (1959)
 Stranger in the House (1963)
 Ballerina on Skates (1964)
 River at Her Feet (1965)
 Girl in the Mirror (1966)
 Too Bad About the Haines Girl (1967)
 The Girl Who Knew Tomorrow (1970)
 Leslie (1972)
 Why Have the Birds Stopped Singing? (1974)
 Girl in the Shadows (1975)

References

External links

1912 births
1995 deaths
American women short story writers
American young adult novelists
Women writers of young adult literature
20th-century American short story writers
20th-century American women writers
Writers from Seattle
Novelists from Washington (state)